Cemetry Road was a cricket ground in Bury St Edmunds, Suffolk.  The ground was known as Field Lane from 1826 to 1854 and was later known as the West Suffolk Cricket Ground.  Today, the location of the ground would be along King's Road in Bury St Edmunds, with the stretch of the A1302 named Parkway bisecting the site.

History
The first recorded match on the ground was in 1827, when the Suffolk played the Marylebone Cricket Club. The ground held two first-class matches, the first in 1830 when Suffolk played the Marylebone Cricket Club and in 1847 when Suffolk played the same opposition. After many decades of use by Suffolk, the ground hosted its first Minor Counties Championship match in 1904 when Suffolk played Cambridgeshire. From 1902 to 1914, the ground hosted eight Minor Counties Championship matches, the last which saw Suffolk play Lincolnshire. It switched from being a cricket ground to a football ground during World War II, with it being the home ground of Bury Town F.C. up until the end of the 1970s. The ground is no longer in existence, having been built over.

Records

First-class
 Highest team total: 159 by Marylebone Cricket Club v Suffolk, 1847
 Lowest team total: 42 by Suffolk v Marylebone Cricket Club, 1847
 Highest individual innings: 60 by Henry Royston for Marylebone Cricket Club v Suffolk, 1847
 Best bowling in an innings: 7-? by Jemmy Dean for Marylebone Cricket Club v Suffolk, 1847
 Best bowling in a match: 11-? by Jemmy Dean, as above

See also
List of cricket grounds in England and Wales

References

External links
Cemetry Road at CricketArchive

Suffolk County Cricket Club
Defunct cricket grounds in England
Cricket grounds in Suffolk
Bury St Edmunds
Defunct football venues in England
Defunct sports venues in Suffolk
Bury Town F.C.